Uzunköprü (tr. Long Bridge), formerly Cisr-i Ergene, is a 15th-century Ottoman stone bridge over the Ergene river in Edirne Province, northwestern Turkey. The bridge gave its name to the nearby town of Uzunköprü. Claimed to be the world's longest stone bridge, Uzunköprü was built to facilitate crossing the Ergene for troops during river floods. Wooden bridges predating the Uzunköprü wore away fast. Construction started in 1426 or 1427, and ended in 1443 or 1444. The stones include several figures and motifs, which were changed over time.

The bridge underwent a series of repairs following earthquakes and floods, which decreased the length of the bridge, and the number of its arches. Heavy vehicles were banned from using the bridge in 2013, as an alternative concrete bridge was being built. The bridge was closed to traffic in September 2021 for another restoration project after several cracks appeared in the stones. The restoration also aims to excavate some of the buried arches.

Background 
Occasional floods at Ergene made the crossings of Ottoman military expeditions into Rumelia difficult. The land also had to be cleared up from spinose structures before construction, which had provided cover for thieves and thugs.

Several wooden bridges on the same location had already preceded the current structure. The wooden bridges were destructed quickly by either enemies or high tides. Murad II ordered a new stone bridge to be made long and strong so that it was still crossable during high tides. Additionally, the stone bridge provided a safe crossing of the marshy location on the Gallipoli–Edirne route.

History

Construction and opening 

Construction on the bridge was started in 1426 or 1427 by head architect Muslihiddin and craftsman Mehmed, and ended in 1443 or 1444. Stones were sourced from quarries in Yağmurca, Eskiköy and Hasırcıarnavut. The bridge was built on a foundation of natural limestone. Khorasan mortar was used to bind the stones together. At places where the bridge legs weren't on stones or strong foundations, stakes were used to support the weight. Once the foundation was ready, the stones making up the arches were laid using wooden molds in the shapes of the arches. This was only possible during dry periods. At wet periods or at places where the river was running, the formwork was placed in special slots, which is a difficult process. This is seen as the reason as to why construction took sixteen years.

The bridge was named Cisr-i Ergene, meaning "Ergene Bridge". A mosque, imaret and madrasa was also built. Additionally, the Yaylar village was founded on the western end of the bridge, while the Uzunköprü town was founded on the eastern end of the bridge. The bridge was opened for use with a ceremony attended by Murad II himself, who was returning from the Battle of Varna.

16th to 20th century 

In 1546, several waterways and mills at the Ergene, as well as the Uzunköprü Bridge were repaired. This was the first recorded restoration of the bridge. The first major restoration was in 1620. The bridge was renamed to Kasr-i Ergene in 1718 for a brief period. When passing through in 1727, French explorer  wrote in his travel book that the residents referred to both the town and the bridge as Uzunköprü. In 1823, due to earthquakes and floods, four arches of the bridge collapsed. Three larger arches were built as a replacement. Some repairs took place in 1891. Due to frequent earthquakes in the late 19th century, three more arches collapsed in 1901. Construction of two arches in their place ended in 1904.

In 1908, the municipality removed some of the stones making up the railings to be used in drinking fountains inside the town. Stones of a dock were also used. There were two mills next to the bridge; one was destroyed in 1956 due to floods during a harsh winter in the area, while the other was destroyed some time before. In 1957, a  section of the dock was filled in to create a car park. From 1964 to 1971, the width of the bridge was expanded by  during a restoration by the General Directorate of Highways. The top of the bridge was also covered with a  layer of steel and concrete. This was done to allow the bridge to accommodate two-way traffic. The dynamic effects of heavy vehicles passing the bridge caused damage to the load-bearing structure. In 1993, gaps between stones were filled with stone mortar.

21st century 

A new concrete bridge built a kilometre (0.62 miles) away by the General Directorate of Highways was opened in 2013 as an alternative, which also banned heavy vehicles from using the historic bridge. In 2015, the bridge was added to the UNESCO World Heritage Site Tentative List in the Cultural category. In 2018, a picture of the historic bridge was meant to be put on the first page of the new Turkish passport. However, the Ministry of Interior accidentally used a picture of the Meriç Bridge instead, while the photo was still labelled as Uzunköprü.

In early 2019, cracks started to appear on the stones at the base that could be seen every . Locals requested the bridge to be restored to its original version as it deviated from its form with the 1971 restoration, and for it to be preserved as a cultural asset. In March 2021, it was announced that the tender for the restoration was completed, and that work on the bridge was set to start soon. In September 2021, the bridge was completely closed to all sorts of traffic for another restoration. With this, 25 arches will be repaired, the asphalt and concrete top will be replaced by natural stones, and missing stones will be completed. The restoration is expected to take around three and a half years.

Specifications 

When it was first completed, the structure was the longest bridge in the Ottoman Empire and later Turkey, a title which it held for 530 years until 1973, when it was surpassed by the Bosphorus Bridge in Istanbul. Uzunköprü is still claimed to be the longest stone bridge in the world. Some of the arches are pointed and some are round. On the stones of the abutments, figures of animals such as elephants, lions and birds were carved, some of which are no longer visible. Some motifs related to the Seljuk Empire can also be found.

There are two balconies on the bridge.

The number of arches dropped to 172 after rebuilds. An additional eight were buried underground, meaning that there are now 164 arches. The restorations which started in 2021 aim to unearth several of the arches. When visiting the town in 1658, famous Ottoman explorer Evliya Çelebi said that the bridge was 2000 stretched steps long. It is believed that some figures and motifs were altered during restorations preceding the 19th century.

References

Citations

Bibliography

External links 

Bridges completed in 1443
Arch bridges in Turkey
Stone bridges in Turkey
Ottoman bridges in Turkey
Buildings and structures in Edirne Province
Road bridges in Turkey
World Heritage Tentative List for Turkey